The 2005 World Summit, held between 14 and 16 September 2005, was a follow-up summit meeting to the United Nations' 2000 Millennium Summit, which had led to the Millennium Declaration of the Millennium Development Goals (MDGs). Representatives (including nearly 200 leaders) of the then 191 member states met in New York City for what the United Nations described as "a once-in-a-generation opportunity to take bold decisions in the areas of development, security, human rights and reform of the United Nations".

Summit Summary
The summit was billed as the "largest gathering of world leaders in history", (as was the 2000 summit), and featured appearances of numerous heads of state and heads of government. According to the organizers, about 170 leaders were present. The majority of those present addressed the U. N. General Assembly (UNGA) and gave speeches reflecting on the U. N.'s past successes and future challenges. All 191 of the then member states gave an address in some form—if the head of state or government was not present, the nation's foreign minister, vice president, or deputy prime minister usually spoke. The meetings were presided over by the Prime Minister of Sweden, Göran Persson, since Swedish Jan Eliasson was President of the 60th UNGA. Negotiations for the World Summit Outcome Document had been under the watchful eye of the President of the 59th UNGA, Mr. Jean Ping of Gabon.

The pre-summit negotiations were blown sharply off course by the appearance in early August at the U. N. of United States Ambassador to the U. N. John Bolton, appointed as a recess appointment by U.S. President George W. Bush. The position had been vacant since January, with responsibilities handled by professional U.S. diplomats. Bolton swiftly issued a list of new demands (including dropping the use of the words "Millennium Development Goals"), which days before the summit had still not been settled. Some observers contended that on the eve of the summit the U.S. struck a more conciliatory tone than expected, something partly credited as a consequence of the outpouring of international support for the U.S. after Hurricane Katrina.

As well as discussing progress on the Millennium Development Goals and re-iterating the world's commitment to them, the summit was convened to address the possible reform of the United Nations; much of this was eventually postponed to a later date. An exception was the endorsement of the "responsibility to protect" (known by the acronyms RtoP and R2P), a formulation of the "right of humanitarian intervention" developed by a U.N. commission and proposed by Kofi Annan as part of his In Larger Freedom reform package. The "Responsibility to Protect" gives the world community the right to intervene in the case of "national authorities manifestly failing to protect their populations from genocide, war crimes, ethnic cleansing and crimes against humanity". There was also broad agreement at the summit to set up a new Human Rights Council.

During the summit, the United Nations Convention Against Corruption received its thirtieth ratification, and as a result entered into force in December 2005.

The inaugural session of the Clinton Global Initiative, organized by the family of William J. Clinton (former President of the USA), was held in New York City to coincide with the 2005 World Summit. This event attracted as many of the same world leaders as the main summit. During his presidency, Mr Clinton has twice hosted more than 150 world leaders during an UN summit, in 1995 and 2000.

Outcome of the 2005 World Summit

At the end of the 2005 Summit the contents of a document, known as the World Summit Outcome Document, were agreed to by the delegations that attended.

It was brought before the United Nations General Assembly for adoption as a resolution on 16 September, where ambassadors made last minute statements and reservations. For example, John Bolton said: "I do wish to make one point clear: the United States understands that reference to the International Conference on Population and Development, the Beijing Declaration and Platform for Action, and the use of the phrase 'reproductive health' in paragraphs 57 (g) and 58 (c) of the outcome document do not create any rights and cannot be interpreted to constitute support, endorsement, or promotion of abortion."

The pressure group The United Nations Association of Great Britain and Northern Ireland (UNA-UK) contend that:

World leaders agreed on a compromise text, including the following notable items:
 the creation of a Peacebuilding Commission to provide a central mechanism to help countries emerging from conflict
 an agreement that the international community has a "responsibility to protect"—the duty to intervene when national governments fail to fulfill their responsibility to protect their citizens from atrocious crimes
 a Human Rights Council (established in 2006)
 an agreement to devote more resources to UN's Office of Internal Oversight Services (OIOS)
 several agreements to spend billions more on achieving the Millennium Development Goals
 a clear and unambiguous condemnation of terrorism "in all its forms and manifestations"
 a democracy fund
 an agreement to wind up the Trusteeship Council due to the completion of its mission

UN Security Council and the protection of civilians in armed conflicts
The United Nations Security Council Resolution 1674, adopted by the United Nations Security Council on 28 April 2006, "reaffirm[ed] the provisions of paragraphs 138 and 139 of the 2005 World Summit Outcome Document regarding the responsibility to protect populations from genocide, war crimes, ethnic cleansing and crimes against humanity" and commits the Security Council to action to protect civilians in armed conflict.

References

Further reading

 United Nations' 2005 World Summit homepage
 Draft outcome document, 5 August (pre-Bolton-requests) (PDF)
 U.S. Revision Package (PDF)
 2005 World Summit Outcome Document, World Health Organization, 15 September 2005
 Summary of Outcome (PDF)
 CBS News, 12 September 2005, "At U.N., Bolton Softens His Tone"
 The Guardian, 10 September 2005, "World summit on UN's future heads for chaos: UK leads last minute effort to rein in U.S. objections"
 Hugo Chávez' address (He proposes the UN be moved out of the US)
 PM Sharon’s Speech at the United Nations Assembly 15 September 2005.
 AlterNet, 19 September 2005, "A Triumph for Decency at the U.N." – on the "Responsibility to Protect"
 Ian Williams, The Guardian, 20 September 2005, "Annan has paid his dues: The UN declaration of a right to protect people from their governments is a millennial change"
 Environment and Poverty Times – Summit 2005 Edition
 Alicia L. Bannon, The Yale Law Journal, "The Responsibility To Protect: The U.N. World Summit and the Question of Unilateralism"

United Nations conferences
2005 in the United States
Diplomatic conferences in the United States
21st-century diplomatic conferences (Global)
2005 in international relations
World Summit